Õssu is a village in Kambja Parish, Tartu County, Estonia. It borders the city of Tartu to the east and is located by the Tartu–Viljandi road. Õssu has a population of 163 (as of 1 September 2010).

References

Villages in Tartu County